Totally Krossed Out is the debut studio album by American hip hop duo Kris Kross. It was produced and largely written by Jermaine Dupri and Joe "The Butcher" Nicolo and released on March 31, 1992, by Ruffhouse Records and Columbia Records. After developing a musical concept for the duo, Dupri and Nicolo spent two years writing and producing the album.

Commercial performance 

Totally Krossed Out was a huge success for the duo, selling over four million copies and reaching No. 1 on the Billboard 200 and the Top R&B/Hip-Hop Albums chart, where it remained for two and six non-consecutive weeks respectively. Four singles were released, including "Jump" and "Warm It Up", both of which reached No. 1 on the Hot Rap Singles, and "I Missed the Bus" and "It's a Shame". The album was certified 4× platinum by the RIAA. Music videos were released for the four singles and for "The Way of Rhyme", even though the song was not released as a single.

Critical reception 
In a contemporary review for The Village Voice, the music critic Robert Christgau gave the album an "A−" and praised Dupri for "avoiding BBD's girl-bashing and ABC's kiddie escapism" in his lyrics for the duo. He found the music "ebullient" and suited for Kris Kross' "preadolescent tempos and timbres". "Jump" was voted the third best single of 1992 in The Village Voices annual Pazz & Jop critics' poll. Christgau, the poll's creator, named it the best single of the year in his own year-end list and also ranked "Warm It Up" at number four.

In a retrospective review, AllMusic's Steve Huey gave the album four out of five stars and said that Dupri "delivers a catchy, pop-friendly batch of tracks that manage to stay pretty consistently engaging (perhaps in part because they are short)".

Track listing 
All songs written and produced by Jermaine Dupri and Joe "The Butcher" Nicolo, except where noted.

"Intro Interview" – 0:51
"Jump" (Jermaine Dupri, Joe "The Butcher" Nicolo, The Corporation, Ohio Players, Roy C, Cypress Hill, Lowell Fulson, Jimmy McCracklin, James Brown, Schoolly D, Naughty by Nature, Herb Rooney) – 3:15
"Lil' Boys in da Hood" – 3:05
"Warm It Up" – 4:08
"The Way of Rhyme" – 2:59
"Party" (Jermaine Dupri, Joe "The Butcher" Nicolo, George Clinton, Garry Shider, David Spradley) – 4:02
"We're in da House" – 0:39
"A Real Bad Dream" – 1:58
"It's a Shame" – 3:46
"Can't Stop the Bum Rush" – 2:57
"You Can't Get With This" – 2:24
"I Missed the Bus" – 2:59
"Outro" – 0:43
"Party" (Krossed Mix) – 4:10
"Jump" (Extended Mix) – 5:10

Personnel 
Credits are adapted from Allmusic.

 Glenn Barratt – editing 
 Walt Bass – background vocals 
 Stacey Blackmore – background vocals
 Tony Dawsey – mastering 
 Curtis Dowd, Jr. – keyboards 
 Jermaine Dupri – arranger, background vocals, bass, executive producer, producer, programming 
 Joe "The Butcher" Nicolo – arranger, engineer, drums, bass, percussion, producer, programming
 Seldon "Big Wally" Henderson – keyboards 
 John Hodian – engineer 
 Frank Hogan – background vocals 
 Charlene Holloway – background vocals
 Paula Holloway – background vocals
 Dave Johnson – background vocals
 Kris Kelly – vocals 
 Andy Kravitz – percussion 

 Kris Kross – vocals 
 Lady G. – background vocals
 Manuel Lecuona – background vocals
 Rose Mann – background vocals
 Joe Nicolo – engineer, executive producer, programming 
 Phil Nicolo – engineer 
 Jim "Jiff" Ninger – background vocals
 Jimmy O'Neil – assistant engineer 
 Jim Salamone – drums, keyboards 
 Mark Schulz – background vocals
 Terry Shelton – voices
 Silk Tymes Leather – background vocals 
 Eddie Weather – background vocals
 X-Man – background vocals

Charts

Weekly charts

Year-end charts

Decade-end charts

Certifications

See also
List of number-one albums of 1992 (U.S.)
List of number-one R&B albums of 1992 (U.S.)

References

Further reading

External links 
 

1992 debut albums
Kris Kross albums
Albums produced by Jermaine Dupri
Ruffhouse Records albums